Shavvaz castle is a castle in Shavvaz, Iran, and is one of the attractions of Yazd Province. This castle was built by the Sasanian Empire.

Sources 

Castles in Iran
Sasanian castles

Tourist attractions in Yazd Province